Graciela Helena Piñeiro Martínez is a Uruguayan biologist and paleontologist.

Her work led to the discovery of Mesosaurus fossils in Uruguay.

References

University of the Republic (Uruguay) alumni
Academic staff of the University of the Republic (Uruguay)
Uruguayan biologists
Uruguayan paleontologists
Living people
Year of birth missing (living people)